Sir Alfred George Tomkins (9 March 1895 – 6 May 1975) was a long-serving British trade union leader.

Tomkins worked as a chair-maker and joined the National Amalgamated Furnishing Trades Association (NAFTA), becoming a branch secretary in 1922.  A member of the Communist Party of Great Britain (CPGB) and supporter of industrial unionism, he quickly became well known through promoting this position at the Trades Union Congress.

In 1923, Tomkins was elected as the union's chairman and, in 1927, he became its full-time London organiser.  After serving as assistant general secretary, he was elected as general secretary in 1941.  He arranged a merger which formed the National Union of Furniture Trade Operatives, and served as general secretary of the new union until 1971, when a further merger formed the Furniture, Timber and Allied Trades Union (FTAT).  Over time, his politics moved to the right, and he became a firm opponent of the CPGB, although he continued to work closely with CPGB members in his union.

Despite being in his mid-seventies, Tomkins was elected as general secretary of FTAT, serving until his death in 1975.  In his spare time, Tomkins served on the Industrial Court, the Council of Industrial Design, and the furniture manufacturing joint industry council.  Shortly before his death, he was awarded a knighthood.

References

1895 births
1975 deaths
Communist Party of Great Britain members
Knights Bachelor
General Secretaries of the Furniture, Timber and Allied Trades Union
Presidents of the General Federation of Trade Unions (UK)